The Kikuyu Central Association (KCA), led by James Beauttah and Joseph Kang'ethe, was a political organisation in colonial Kenya formed in 1924 to act on behalf of the Gĩkũyũ community by presenting their concerns to the British government. One of its greatest grievances was the expropriation of the most productive land by British settlers from African farmers. Most members of the organisation were from the Gĩkũyũ tribe.

KCA was formed after the colonial government banned the earlier Young Kikuyu Association founded by Harry Thuku and the East African Association. In either 1925 or early 1926, Beauttah moved to Uganda, although remained in contact with Kenyatta. When the KCA wrote to Beauttah and asked him to travel to London as their representative, he declined, but recommended that Kenyatta who had a good command of the English language go in his place. Kenyatta accepted, probably on the condition that the Association matched his pre-existing wage. He thus became the group's secretary. Jomo Kenyatta, later the first president of Kenya, joined it to become its General Secretary in 1927.

The Kikuyu Central Association was banned in 1940 when World War II reached East Africa. Some fighters of the later Mau-Mau still understood their struggle as continuation of KCA and even called themselves KCA.
WAZI BUDA

The end of World War II, however, saw the new type of African organisation that went beyond tribal boundaries with the rise of the Kenya African Union that later was to become KANU.

KCA published the Muiguithania ("the reconciler"), a Kikuyu language newspaper. It was banned alongside KCA in 1940.

See also
Campaign against female genital mutilation in Kenya, 1929-32
Taita Hills Association

References 
 Muigwithania 2.0 - The original KCA publication banned by the colonial government revived on the Internet in 2008

External links
The reason behind KCA
Another article on KCA

History of Kenya
Political parties established in 1924
British Kenya